Q, or q, is the seventeenth letter of the Latin alphabet, used in the modern English alphabet, the alphabets of other western European languages and others worldwide. Its name in English is pronounced , most commonly spelled cue, but also kew, kue and que.

History

Some have even suggested that the form of the letter Q is even more ancient: it could have originated from Egyptian hieroglyphics.

Therefore, qoppa was transformed into two letters: qoppa, which stood for the number 90, and phi (Φ), which stood for the aspirated sound  that came to be pronounced  in Modern Greek.

The Etruscans used Q in conjunction with V to represent , and this usage was copied by the Romans with the rest of their alphabet. Of these, Q was used before a rounded vowel (e.g. 'ego'), K before /a/ (e.g. 'calendis'), and C elsewhere. Later, the use of C (and its variant G) replaced most usages of K and Q: Q survived only to represent /k/ when immediately followed by a /w/ sound.

Typography

Uppercase "Q" 
Depending on the typeface used to typeset the letter Q, the letter's tail may either bisect its bowl as in Helvetica, meet the bowl as in Univers, or lie completely outside the bowl as in PT Sans. In writing block letters, bisecting tails are fastest to write, as they require less precision. All three styles are considered equally valid, with most serif typefaces having a Q with a tail that meets the circle, while sans-serif typefaces are more equally split between those with bisecting tails and those without. Typefaces with a disconnected Q tail, while uncommon, have existed since at least 1529. A common method among type designers to create the shape of the Q is by simply adding a tail to the letter O.

Old-style serif fonts, such as Garamond, may contain two capital Qs: one with a short tail to be used in short words, and another with a long tail to be used in long words. Some early metal type fonts included up to 3 different Qs: a short-tailed Q, a long-tailed Q, and a long-tailed Q-u ligature. This print tradition was alive and well until the 19th century, when long-tailed Qs fell out of favor: even recreations of classic typefaces such as Caslon began being distributed with only short Q tails. Not a fan of long-tailed Qs, American typographer D. B. Updike celebrated their demise in his 1922 book Printing Types, claiming that Renaissance printers made their Q tails longer and longer simply to "outdo each other". Latin-language words, which are much more likely than English words to contain "Q" as their first letter, have also been cited as the reason for their existence. The long-tailed Q had fallen out of use with the advent of early digital typography, as many early digital fonts could not choose different glyphs based on the word that the glyph was in, but it has seen something of a comeback with the advent of OpenType fonts and LaTeX, both of which can automatically typeset the long-tailed Q when it is called for and the short-tailed Q when it is not.

Identifont, an automatic typeface identification service that identifies typefaces by questions about their appearance, asks about the Q tail second if the "sans-serif" option is chosen. In the Identifont database, the distribution of Q tails is:

Some type designers prefer one "Q" design over another: Adrian Frutiger, famous for the airport typeface that bears his name, remarked that most of his typefaces feature a Q tail that meets the bowl and then extends horizontally. Frutiger considered such Qs to make for more "harmonious" and "gentle" typefaces. "Q" often makes the list of their favorite letters; for example, Sophie Elinor Brown, designer of Strato, has listed "Q" as being her favorite letter.

Lowercase "q" 

The lowercase "q" is usually seen as a lowercase "o" or "c" with a descender (i.e., downward vertical tail) extending from the right side of the bowl, with or without a swash (i.e., flourish), or even a reversed lowercase p. The "q"'s descender is usually typed without a swash due to the major style difference typically seen between the descenders of the "g" (a loop) and "q" (vertical). When handwritten, or as part of a handwriting font, the descender of the "q" sometimes finishes with a rightward swash to distinguish it from the letter "g" (or, particularly in mathematics, the digit "9").

Pronunciation and use

Phonetic and phonemic transcription
The International Phonetic Alphabet uses  for the voiceless uvular stop.

English standard orthography
In English, the digraph  most often denotes the cluster ; however, in borrowings from French, it represents , as in 'plaque'. See the list of English words containing Q not followed by U. Q is the second least frequently used letter in the English language (after Z), with a frequency of just 0.1% in words. Q has the fourth fewest English words where it is the first letter, after X, Z, and Y.

Other orthographies
In most European languages written in the Latin script, such as in Romance and Germanic languages,  appears almost exclusively in the digraph . In Italian  represents  (where  is the semivowel allophone of ). In Albanian, Q represents  as in Shqip.

It is not considered to be part of the Cornish (Standard Written Form), Estonian, Icelandic, Irish, Latvian, Lithuanian, Polish, Serbo-Croatian, Scottish Gaelic, Slovenian, Turkish, or Welsh alphabets.

 has a wide variety of other pronunciations in some European languages and in non-European languages that have adopted the Latin alphabet.

Other uses
The capital letter Q is used as the currency sign for the Guatemalan quetzal.

The Roman numeral Q is sometimes used to represent the number 500,000.

In Turkey the use of the letter Q was banned between 1928 and 2013. This constituted a problem for the Kurdish population in Turkey as the letter was a part of the Kurdish alphabet. The ones who used the letter Q, were able to be prosecuted and sentenced to prison terms ranging from six months to two years.
In the video game Quake the letter is stylized as the logo for the franchise.

Related characters

Descendants and related characters in the Latin alphabet
Q with diacritics: ʠ Ɋ ɋ q̃
Japanese linguistics: Small capital q (ꞯ) and modifier letter capital q (ꟴ)
𐞥 Modifier letter small q is used as a superscript IPA letter
Gha: Ƣ ƣ

Ancestors and siblings in other alphabets
𐤒 : Semitic letter Qoph, from which the following symbols originally derive
Ϙ ϙ: Greek letter Koppa
𐌒 : Old Italic Q, which is the ancestor of modern Latin Q
Ԛ ԛ : Cyrillic letter Qa

Derived signs, symbols and abbreviations
℺ : rotated capital Q, a signature mark
Ꝗ ꝗ, Ꝙ ꝙ : Various forms of Q were used for medieval scribal abbreviations

Computing codes

 1

Other representations

See also

References

Notes

External links

ISO basic Latin letters